Dawn Austin Bonnell is the Senior Vice Provost for Research at the University of Pennsylvania. She has previously served as the Founding Director of the National Science Foundation Nano–Bio Interface Center, Vice President of the American Ceramic Society and President of the American Vacuum Society.

Early life and education 
Bonnell grew up in suburban Detroit. She was the eldest of four children. She deferred applying to college until she had started her own family, but, seven years later, found herself a single mother in need of more education to support her own children. At the time Bonnell lived next door to the University of Michigan, and eventually applied to study there. Bonnell specialized in materials science and engineering at the University of Michigan. Bonnell particularly enjoyed the chemistry aspects of her introductory science courses. She earned her bachelor's degree in 1983 and her PhD under the supervision of Tseng-Ying Tien in 1986. Her doctoral research involved identifying stable phases of silicon nitride systems, with a focus on improving the mechanical properties at high temperature. She spent a year at the Max Planck Institute for Solid State Research – with her two children – where she worked with Manfred Ruehle on electron microscopy. She was a postdoctoral scholar at the Thomas J. Watson Research Center. The research centre was home to the first scanning tunnelling microscope, and Bonnell appreciated the potential of scanning tunnelling microscopy as a means to accelerate our understanding of ceramics.

Research and career 
In 1988 Bonnell joined the faculty of the University of Pennsylvania. Her research has involved investigations into the structure-property relations of ceramic materials as well as studies into how the surface morphology impacts chemical reactions. Her research group were the first to successfully image oxide surfaces with atomic resolution, which they achieved using scanning probe microscopy. She has also investigated ferroelectric compounds, synthetic proteins and quantum dots. The ability to visualize the atomic structure of surfaces and interfaces, and has applications in catalysis, biosensing and nanofabrication.

In 2004 Bonnell founded the University of Pennsylvania Nano/Bio Interface Center (NBIC), which supports collaboration between researchers working at the intersection of biology, chemistry and technology. As part of NBIC, Bonnell developed a new nanotechnology program for undergraduate students at the University of Pennsylvania. NBIC is home to several scanning probe-equipment facilities, and can support research in the life sciences as well as emerging technologies.

Bonnell was made Vice Provost for Research in 2013. She was also elected a member of the National Academy of Engineering in 2013 for the development of atomic-resolution surface probes, and for institutional leadership in nanoscience.

Awards and honours 
 National Science Foundation Presidential Young Investigator Award
 American Ceramic Society Robert B. Sosman Award
 American Ceramic Society Ross Coffin Purdy Award
 University of Michigan Distinguished Alumni Award
 American Ceramic Society Distinguished Member
 George H. Heilmeier Award for Excellence in Faculty Research
 Elected Fellow of the American Association for the Advancement of Science
 Elected Fellow of the American Ceramic Society
 Elected to the National Academy of Engineering
 Elected Fellow of the Materials Research Society
 ETH Zürich Staudinger-Durrer Medal

Selected publications 
 Imaging mechanism of piezoresponse force microscopy of ferroelectric surfaces (DOI:10.1103/PhysRevB.65.125408)
 Local potential and polarization screening on ferroelectric surfaces (DOI:10.1103/PhysRevB.63.125411)
 Local impedance imaging and spectroscopy of polycrystalline ZnO using contact atomic force microscopy (DOI:10.1063/1.1561168)

References 

Living people
Year of birth missing (living people)
Women materials scientists and engineers
American materials scientists
American women engineers
University of Pennsylvania faculty
University of Michigan alumni
American women academics
21st-century American women